Gary Brozenich is a visual effects supervisor. Brozenich and his fellow visual effects artists were nominated for an Academy Award for Best Visual Effects for the 2013 film The Lone Ranger.

References

External links

Living people
Visual effects supervisors
Year of birth missing (living people)